Karl Wade Smesko (born October 2, 1970) is the current head coach of the Florida Gulf Coast University (FGCU) women's basketball team.

High school
Born in Bath Township, Summit County, Ohio, Smesko played point guard for Revere High School. He was considered strong, but not fast. He played well enough to garner interest from a small college in Oakland California, but he chose to attend Kent State University.

College career
While at Kent State, pursuing a communication degree, Smesko attempted to walk-on to the basketball team but initially was unsuccessful. He tried again as a senior, and made the team. However, he ended up leaving the team to help care for a family member. He graduated summa cum laude in 1993.

Coaching career
Smesko started coaching boys' basketball at his alma mater, Revere High School, while still in college.
 He briefly worked as an intern at a local TC station, but he preferred coaching so he decided to pursue a coaching career. He had attended basketball camps run by Bob Knight and became enamored with Knight's coaching philosophy. He continued to coach at the high school, while reaching out to secure a college position. Among the coaches he contracted was Herb Sendek, the head coach at Arizona State University. Sendek didn't have a position for him, but did have some advice, urging Smesko obtain his master's degree.

One of the local schools, Walsh University, had a suitable program, but the position came with a requirement to assist with the women's basketball program. He had never considered coaching women's basketball but he accepted the opportunity. He assisted the head coach with weight-room and workout sessions for the players, as well as tape analysis. He completed his master's in a year, and then planned to take a job as an assistant with a men's basketball team. However, Michelle Steele, the head coach of the team, resigned at the end of the 1996–97 season. The players approached the athletic director of Walsh, Jim Dennison, to push him to name Smesko to the head coaching position. It didn't take much pushing, as Dennison was supportive. Smesko accepted the position.
The Cavaliers, who had been 105–117 under their prior coach, were not expected to be a strong team. They were picked to finish in sixth place in the nine-team Mid-Ohio Conference. Under Smesko, the team improved. In the Mid-Ohio Conference tournament, the team made it to the championship game, but lost to Shawnee State. The team assumed they needed a win to earn the automatic bid to the Division II tournament, so the players left to head home for spring break. However, the selection committee chose Walsh as the final bid to the 32-team postseason tournament. As the last team in the field, they were not expected to win a single game. Smesko's father did not consider making the drive to attend the tournament, held in Sioux City, Iowa. After winning their third game, Smesko called his father to let him know the Cavaliers were still playing. Despite a snowstorm, his father made the drive, which took ten hours, to reach the tournament. The team defeated Doane College in the semi-final, then faced Mary Hardin-Baylor in the championship game. Walsh scored a come-from-behind victory to secure the National Championship, the first time ever an unseeded team had won an NAIA National Championship. The accomplishment helped Semsko earn NAIA Coach of the Year honors.

Smesko accepted an assistant coaching position at Maryland in 1998. He served as an assistant under Chris Weller. He remained in that position for one season. After that season, Smesko was hired by IPFW as the head coach of the women's basketball program. The Mastodons had gone 6–20 in 1997–98, and dropped to 2–24 in 1998–99. Under Smesko, the team improved to 13–14 in 1999–00, and improved again in the following year to produce a 19–8 record.

Smesko's success didn't go unnoticed. FGCU approached him about becoming the head of the women's basketball program. At the time, the school did not have a basketball program. The school had only been founded in 1991, with classes not having started until 1997, and not only had no team, it had no real athletic facilities. The plans at the time were to start as an NAIA program, while applying for NCAA Division II status. Despite the challenges, Smesko accepted the position, and spent the next year working out of the school's trailer to build a program from scratch. He persuaded players to come to the school, even though the first workout would take place on asphalt outdoor courts, while the school built an indoor facility.
In his first game, his team won by 17 points. By the time the season ended, they had but a single loss for a record of 30–1. The team continued to excel, amassing a record of 132–21 as a DII team. In 2007, FGCU applied to become a Division I school, as part of the Atlantic Sun Conference, now known as the ASUN Conference. The Eagles have competed in that conference ever since, finishing first or second in the conference every year. In 2011, they completed the transition to full Division I status, and eligibility for post season tournaments. Under his leadership, FGCU has made the Division I NCAA Tournament seven times, in 2012, 2014, 2015, 2017, 2018, 2019, 2021, and 2022, pulling first round upsets in 2015 and 2018.

Head coaching record
Source:

Personal
Smesko's father, Albert, coached high school boys' basketball and is a member of the Akron Coaches Association Hall of Fame. His brother, Kyle, coaches football as the offensive coordinator for Allegheny  College

Awards and honors
 1998—NAIA Coach of the Year
 1998—Mid-Ohio Conference Coach of the Year
 2007—DII South Region Coach of the Year
 2009—Atlantic Sun Coach of the Year
 2011—Atlantic Sun Coach of the Year
 2012—Atlantic Sun Coach of the Year
 2012—Kay Yow Award
 2012—Ohio Basketball Hall of Fame (as coach of the 1998 Walsh University National Champions)
 2013—Atlantic Sun Coach of the Year
 2013—Coach of the Year College Sports Madness 2013 All-Mid Major Teams
 2014—Atlantic Sun Coach of the Year
 2015—Atlantic Sun Coach of the Year
 2016—Atlantic Sun Coach of the Year
 2016—espnW Mid-Major Coach of the Year
 2018—Atlantic Sun Coach of the Year
 2019—Atlantic Sun Coach of the Year

Footnotes

References

External links
 Florida Gulf Coast Women's Basketball Official Site

1970 births
Living people
American men's basketball players
American women's basketball coaches
Basketball coaches from Ohio
Basketball players from Ohio
Florida Gulf Coast Eagles women's basketball coaches
High school basketball coaches in the United States
Kent State Golden Flashes men's basketball players
Maryland Terrapins women's basketball coaches
Purdue Fort Wayne Mastodons women's basketball coaches
People from Bath Township, Summit County, Ohio
Point guards